Crossognathiformes is an extinct order of ray-finned fish that lived from the Late Jurassic to the Eocene. Its phylogenetic placement is disputed; some authors have recovered it as part of the teleost stem group, while others place it in a basal position within crown group Teleostei.

Classification
Order Crossognathiformes Taverne, 1989
 Bavarichthys Arratia & Tischlinger, 2010
 Kradimus Veysey et al., 2020
 Family Varasichthyidae Arratia, 1981
 Bobbichthys Arratia, 1986
 Domeykos Arratia & Schultze, 1985
 Luisichthys White, 1942
 Protoclupea Arratia et al., 1975
 Varasichthys Arratia, 1981
 Family Chongichthyidae Arratia, 1982
 Chongichthys Arratia, 1982
 Suborder Crossognathoidei Taverne, 1989
 Family Crossognathidae Woodward, 1901 [Apsopelicidae Romer, 1966; Syllaemidae Cragin, 1901; Pelecorapidae Cragin, 1901]
 Apsopelix Cope, 1871 [Helmintholepis Cockerell, 1919; Leptichthys Stewart, 1899; Palaeoclupea Dante, 1942; Pelecorapis Cope, 1874; Syllaemus Cope, 1875]
 Crossognathus Pictet, 1858
 Suborder Pachyrhizodontoidei Forey, 1977
 Family Notelopidae Forey, 1977
 Notelops Woodward, 1901
 Family Pachyrhizodontidae Cope, 1872 [Greenwoodellidae Taverne, 1973; Thrissopatrinae Boulenger, 1904b]
 Apricenapiscis Taverne, 2013
 Aquilopiscis Cumbaa & Murray, 2008
 Cavinichthys Taverne & Capasso, 2019
 Elopopsis Heckel, 1856
 Goulmimichthys Cavin, 1995
 Greenwoodella Taverne & Ross, 1973
 Hemielopopsis Bassani, 1879
 Lebrunichthys Taverne & Capasso, 2020
 Michin Alvarado-Ortega et al., 2008
 Motlayoichthys Arratia et al., 2018
 Nardopiscis Taverne, 2008
 Pachyrhizodus Dixon, 1850 [Acrodontosaurus Mason, 1869; Eurychir Jordan, 1924; Oricardinus Cope, 1872; Thrissopater Günther, 1872 sensu Forey, 1977] 
 Phacolepis Agassiz, 1841 [Rhacolepis Agassiz, 1841 non Frenguelli, 1942]
 Platinx Agassiz, 1835
 Polcynichthys London & Shimada, 2020
 Rhacolepis Agassiz, 1843
 Stanhopeichthys Taverne & Capasso, 2020
 Tingitanichthys Taverne, 1996

Timeline of genera

Bibliography

References

 
Prehistoric ray-finned fish orders